Main Street Bridge may refer to:

Main Street Bridge (New Blaine, Arkansas)
Main Street Bridge (Florence, Colorado), listed on the NRHP in Fremont County, Colorado
Main Street Bridge (Stamford, Connecticut)
Main Street Bridge (Daytona Beach, Florida), carries County Road 4040 (Volusia County, Florida) across the Atlantic Intracoastal Waterway
Main Street Bridge (Jacksonville, Florida)
Main Street Bridge (Charles City, Iowa)
Main Street Bridge (Elkhorn, Nebraska), listed on the NRHP in Douglas County, Nebraska
Main Street Bridge (Califon, New Jersey), listed on the NRHP in Hunterdon County, New Jersey
Main Street Bridge (Clinton, New Jersey), listed on the NRHP in Hunterdon County, New Jersey
Main Street Bridge (Rochester, New York)
Scuppernong River Bridge, Columbia, North Carolina, also known as Main Street Bridge
Rainbow Arch Bridge (Valley City, North Dakota), also known as Main Street Bridge
Main Street Bridge (Columbus, Ohio)
Main Street Bridge (Hillsboro, Oregon), a MAX Light Rail bridge
Main Street Bridge (Pawtucket, Rhode Island)
Paddock Viaduct, Fort Worth, Texas, also known as Main Street Bridge

See also
East Main Street Bridge, Corbin, Kentucky